Upper Aquetong Valley Historic District is a national historic district located in Solebury Township, Bucks County, Pennsylvania.  The district includes 55 contributing buildings, 3 contributing sites, and 11 contributing structures along Meeting House Road and the upper branch of Aquetong Creek.  It overlaps with the Honey Hollow Watershed National Historic Landmark. The district encompasses a dozen farmsteads composed of 18th and 19th century farmhouses with their associated outbuildings.  A number of the houses exhibit vernacular Federal and Georgian style details.   Architecturally notable buildings include the Solebury Meeting House (c. 1806) and the Federal style John Blackfan House (c. 1836).

It was added to the National Register of Historic Places in 1987.

References

Historic districts in Bucks County, Pennsylvania
Georgian architecture in Pennsylvania
Federal architecture in Pennsylvania
Historic districts on the National Register of Historic Places in Pennsylvania
National Register of Historic Places in Bucks County, Pennsylvania